Adam Haldane-Duncan, 2nd Earl of Camperdown (25 March 1812 – 30 January 1867), styled Viscount Duncan between 1831 and 1859, was a British nobleman and politician.

Life
Born in Edinburgh, the Hon. Adam Duncan was educated at Eton College and Trinity College, Cambridge. He first entered parliament as a member for Southampton in 1837, which seat he held until 1841 when he exchanged it for Bath. He was briefly out of parliament between 1852 and 1854, when he was returned again, this time for Forfarshire. He held this seat until he was elevated to the House of Lords in 1859 on the death of his father, the first earl. His children included his heir Robert, George and Julia who was a courtier and notable artist.

Lord Camperdown died on 30 January 1867 at the age of 54.

References

External links 
 

Camperdown, Adam Haldane-Duncan, 2nd Earl of
Camperdown, Adam Haldane-Duncan, 2nd Earl of
British people of Scottish descent
Camperdown, Adam Haldane-Duncan, 2nd Earl of
Members of the Parliament of the United Kingdom for English constituencies
Members of the Parliament of the United Kingdom for Scottish constituencies
UK MPs 1837–1841
UK MPs 1841–1847
UK MPs 1847–1852
UK MPs 1852–1857
UK MPs 1857–1859
Camperdown, Adam Haldane-Duncan, 2nd Earl of
Politics of Bath, Somerset
People educated at Eton College
Alumni of Trinity College, Cambridge